Molnár (or Molnar) is a Hungarian surname meaning "miller". The word might be a loanword from Slavic "mlynar" with the same meaning however most likely derived from the old Germanic "Mulinari”. 

It is the name of one of the most famous playwrights of Hungary, Ferenc Molnár (1878–1952).

Other people with the name include:

 Albert Szenczi Molnár (1574–1634), Hungarian Calvinist pastor, linguist, philosopher, poet, religious writer and translator
 Antal Molnár (born 1890), Hungarian musicologist; :hu:Molnár Antal
 Balázs Molnár (born 1977), Hungarian footballer
 Charles Molnar (1935–1996), American electrical engineer and computer developer
 Charley Molnar (born 1961), American football coach
 C. Pál Molnár/Pál C. Molnár (born 1894); :hu:Molnár C. Pál
 Chris Molnar (born 1987), American writer, editor and publisher
 Csilla Molnár (1969–1986), Hungarian beauty queen, crowned Miss Hungary in 1985
 Endre Molnár (born 1945), Hungarian water polo player
 Erika Molnar (born 1976), Hungarian athlete
 Farkas Molnár (1897–1945), Hungarian architect, painter, essayist, and graphic artist.
 Ferenc Molnár (disambiguation)
 Ferenc Molnár (born Ferenc Neumann 1878–1952), Jewish Hungarian (later US) writer
 Ferenc Molnár (football manager) (1885–?), football player and later manager
 Ferenc Molnár (footballer) (born 1891), football player and later manager in Italy
 Ferenc Molnár (athlete) (1904–?), Hungarian Olympic athlete
 Ferenc Zoltán Molnár (1943–1967), U.S. Army soldier and Medal of Honor recipient
 Ferenc Molnár (singer) (born 1982), known professionally as Caramel, winner of the second series of Megasztár
 Fritz M. de Molnár (fl. 20c), Hungarian International Scout Commissioner
 George Molnar (1910–1998), Australian cartoonist
 George Molnar (philosopher) (1934 – 1999), Australian
 Gergely Molnár (born 1950), a Hungarian; :hu:Molnár Gergely
 Géza Molnár (born 1923), Hungarian writer; :hu:Molnár Géza
 György Molnár (born 1901), Hungarian footballer
 Imre Lakatos (known as Imre Molnár for a time), philosopher
 Ingo Molnár, Hungarian Linux kernel hacker
 István Molnár (born 1913, Galánta), water polo player and Olympian
 István Molnár (chemist) (born 1950), chemist and translator :hu:Molnár István (műfordító)
 József Molnár (1821–1899), Hungarian painter
 József Molnár (1918–2009), Hungarian writer
 Miklos Molnar (born 1970), Danish football (soccer) player
 Mónika Molnar (:hu:Mónika Molnár)
 Mária Molnár (born 1966), Hungarian art critic
 Pavol Molnár (born 1936), Slovak football player
 Péter Molnár (disambiguation)
 Péter Molnár (academic), Hungarian academic and former politician
 Péter Molnár (footballer) (born 1983), football goalkeeper from Slovakia who currently plays for Paksi SE
 Peter Molnar (geophysicist), professor in geological sciences
 Péter Molnár (canoeist) (born 1986), Olympic Hungarian canoeist
 Ralph E. Molnar, Australian paleontologist and museum curator
 Steve Molnar (born 1947), player of Canadian football*
 Tamás Molnár (born 1975), Hungarian water polo player
 Thomas Molnar (1921–2010), Catholic philosopher, historian and political theorist
 Tibor Molnár (1921–1982), Hungarian film actor
 Vera Molnár (born 1924), artist of Hungarian origin
 Zoltán Molnár (footballer, born 1971), Hungarian footballer 
 Zoltán Molnár (footballer, born 1973), Hungarian footballer
 Zoltán Molnár (rower) (born 1961), Hungarian rower

Hungarian-language surnames
Occupational surnames